Nokilalaki Mountain is a mountain located in Palolo, Sigi Regency, Central Sulawesi, Indonesia.

References

Mountains of Indonesia
Landforms of Central Sulawesi